Nick Fudge (aka Nicholas Fudge, born 12 August 1961) is a British painter, sculptor, and digital artist.

Fudge studied at Goldsmiths College, London, as a member of the YBA (Young British Artists) generation along with Damien Hirst, Sarah Lucas, Liam Gillick, Gary Hume, and Michael Landy. At the time, his tutors Michael Craig-Martin and Jon Thompson expected Fudge to attain comparable success when, just before his graduate show, he destroyed all his artwork and disappeared from the international art world for over twenty-five years. In a 2016 story commemorating his return to the art world, The Times arts correspondent Jack Malvern dubbed Fudge "The Lost YBA".

Education and influences 
Nick Fudge attended Christ's College, Finchley from 1972 to 1977 (when it was still a grammar school) where he was in the same class group as the writer Will Self. He left early, at sixteen, to attend a graphic design course at Barnet College.

Fudge graduated from Goldsmiths College, London, in 1988, despite destroying all his student work on the eve of his graduate show, an act inspired by a Duchampian thought-experiment which asked "what if an artist just disappeared?" 
Shortly thereafter, Fudge "went underground"; moving to the United States with his then-wife, the radical poet Tracy Angel. He received his MFA from Tyler School of Art in Philadelphia, Pennsylvania.

After graduating from Tyler, Fudge and Angel embarked upon an extended exploration of America. This road trip, with its emphasis in the American West, was formative for Fudge; "a kind of rebirth".  
Fudge counts the Modernist painters Marcel Duchamp, Pablo Picasso, Francis Picabia, and Jasper Johns, the poet T. S. Eliot, and the writer James Joyce amongst his biggest influences.

Work 
For the twenty-five years that Fudge remained in self-imposed exile from the art world, he made and kept his ongoing work in secret, showing his paintings and digital works to only a few other artists and close friends. He began creating digital artworks in the early 1990s when he found a Macintosh Classic II in a thrift store in Montana and, sharing it with Angel who used it to write her poems, taught himself the graphics software of the day. He claims that his entire digital oeuvre is still stored on outmoded macOS hard drives, almost impossible to access using modern laptops. The Berlin-based art critic and curator An Paenhuysen has described these works as "post-internet in the way that [they use] the tools of the Web to create an object that in the end exists in the real world. The long incubation period of the work (1994–2015) [as an] editable digital image file... shows no trace of work over a period of time... As such, Fudge's prints are simultaneously dated and futuristic. They are modern, postmodern, and post-postmodern, all in one".

Fudge's oil paintings display a deep understanding of the Modernist canon; borrowings from, and reimaginings of Cubist or Abstract Expressionist works are made to question painting itself as against digital-age hyper-imaging with its easy image editing and erasure.

His sculptural works include exquisitely crafted faux luxury products and art supplies Branded "Fudge"; "Old Masters Soaps" (soap bars upon which have been painted exacting reproductions of Rembrandt sketches), and "Picasso Drive", a crushed Citroën C4 Picasso permanently installed at the Observer Building in Hastings.

Exhibitions 
1992, Karsten Schubert, London, "Fifth Anniversary Exhibition", curated by Michael Landy. Group show featuring Mat Collishaw, Keith Coventry, Tobias Eyferth, Nick Fudge, and Sarah Lucas
1994, Temple Art Gallery, Philadelphia, "Materials for Nothing", MFA thesis exhibition
2014, 王欣 The Gallery, Shanghai, "Westbund Art & Design Fair", curated by Wan Xin
2015, Observer Arts, Hastings, "Obscured by Clouds", a two-person exhibition (with Phil King)
2015, Zwitscher Maschine, Berlin, "Die Lichtenberg Norm", curated by Spunk Seipel
2015–16, Albus 3 Arts, Northampton, "Borderlands", group exhibition
2016, Observer Arts, Hastings, "Reality Drive", solo exhibition
2016, Fitzrovia Gallery, London, "Reality Drive:Escape Velocity", solo exhibition
2018, HSBC HQ Canada Square, London, "Undo Redo Return", solo exhibition and artist's talk
2019, Kunstverein Speyer, Berlin, "Digital Divide", group exhibition with artists Römer + Römer and Andreas Lau
2021, Hilbert Raum, Berlin, "Digital Divide II", group exhibition with artists Römer + Römer, Andreas Lau, Enda O'Donoghue and Sandra Schlipkoeter

References

External links 
 
 PDF of "Susie Hamilton in Conversation with Nick Fudge", Turps Banana Magazine, Issue 18, July 2017

1961 births
20th-century English painters
Alumni of Goldsmiths, University of London
British digital artists
English contemporary artists
Living people
Young British Artists